The Sterling and Francine Clark Art Institute, commonly referred to as the Clark, is an art museum and research institution located in Williamstown, Massachusetts, United States. Its collection consists of European and American paintings, sculpture, prints, drawings, photographs, and decorative arts from the fourteenth to the early twentieth century. The Clark, along with the Massachusetts Museum of Contemporary Art (MASS MoCA) and the Williams College Museum of Art (WCMA), forms a trio of art museums in the Berkshires. The institute also serves as a center for research and higher learning. It is home to various research and academic programs, which include the Fellowship Program and the Williams College Graduate Program in the History of Art, as well as one of the most distinguished research libraries in the country, with more than 295,000 volumes in over 72 languages. The Clark is visited by 200,000 people a year.

History

Origins
"The Clark" was created in 1955 in association with Williams College by entrepreneur, soldier, explorer, and prominent art collector Robert Sterling Clark, and his wife, Francine. After numerous adventures in the Far East, Sterling settled in Paris in 1911 and used a considerable fortune inherited from his grandfather (a principal in the Singer Sewing Machine Company) to begin amassing a private art collection. Francine joined him in collecting works of art after their marriage in 1919.

The Clarks kept their collection largely private, rarely lending out any works. With the onset of the Cold War and rapid nuclear armament, they became increasingly worried about the safety of their artworks. They wanted to protect their collection from a possible attack on New York City, where they lived and where the expected heir of their collection, the Metropolitan Museum of Art, was located. As such, the Clarks began looking at sites in rural New York and Massachusetts with the intention of founding a museum for their art.

They visited Williamstown, Massachusetts in 1949 and began having conversations with town leaders and the administrators of Williams College and the Williams College Museum of Art. Sterling had ties to the college through his grandfather and father, both of whom had been trustees. A charter for the Clark was signed on March 14, 1950 and the Institute opened to the public on May 17, 1955 under its first director, former silver dealer Peter Guille. The Clark has since become a destination for tourists, art lovers, and scholars, helping to establish the cultural reputation of the Berkshires.

Architecture

The original marble gallery building, designed by Daniel Deverell Perry, opened in 1955. The Pietro Belluschi-designed Manton Research Center, housing the library and research programs, was completed in 1973. The Clark embarked on a long-term project in 2001 to improve its campus, enlisting the help of landscape firm Reed Hildebrand and architects Tadao Ando and Annabelle Selldorf.

Reed Hilderbrand redesigned the campus grounds, revamping nearby walking trails, planting 1,000 trees, and creating a reflecting pool fed by recycled water.

Tadao Ando designed two additions: the Lunder Center at Stone Hill and the 42,600-square-foot Clark Center, which opened in 2008 and 2014, respectively.  Envisioned as a sanctuary in the woods waiting to be discovered, the Lunder Center features two galleries and a seasonal terrace café. It is also home to the Williamstown Art Conservation Center, the largest regional conservation center in the country.

The Clark Center includes more than 11,000 square feet of gallery space for special exhibitions; new dining, retail, and family spaces; and an all-glass Museum Pavilion that creates a new entrance to the original Museum Building. Situated northwest of the Museum Building, the stone, concrete, and glass Clark Center is the centerpiece of the Clark's campus and serves as its primary visitor entrance.

Annabelle Selldorf was commissioned to renovate the campus’ existing structures. In the 1955 original marble building, galleries for American and decorative art were added and exhibition space was increased by 15%. In the Manton Research Center, which reopened in 2016, the auditorium and central courtyard were renovated and several galleries and a study center were created. Its renovation marked the completion of the Clark's all-encompassing expansion project.

The museum's most recent $145 million expansion project has been funded through private donations, foundation support, the Massachusetts Cultural Facilities Fund, and bond financing organized in conjunction with the Commonwealth of Massachusetts.

Research and Academic Program
The Research and Academic Program (RAP) is the manifestation of the Clark's original commitment to academic research and scholarly study. The program began in the late 1990s with the establishment of the Clark Library and the Graduate Program in the History of Art. Under the direction of John Onians, Michael Ann Holly, and Darby English, the program has since widened its purview to partner with both regional and international institutions and scholars to challenge and expand the scope of the study and production of the visual arts. Caroline Fowler is the Starr Director of the Research and Academic Program at the Clark and teaches in the Graduate Program in the History of Art at Williams College.

The Research and Academic Program also awards between ten and sixteen Clark Fellowships a year, ranging in duration from four weeks to ten months. Clark Fellowships allow promising scholars, critics, and museum officials opportunities for research outside of their professional obligations. Fellows, along with scholars and students from all stretches of the world, are encouraged to participate in the various conferences, colloquia, workshops, curator round tables, and seminars hosted by the program.

Publications like The Clark Studies in the Visual Arts, based on the proceedings of the annual Clark Conferences, serve as another forum for the interdisciplinary exploration of art historical issues. Interested audiences can also tune into the Research and Academic Program podcast, In the Foreground: Conversations on Art & Writing, which offers a lively, in-depth look into the life and mind of a scholar or artist working with art historical or visual material.

Williams College Graduate Program in the History of Art 
The Williams College Graduate Program in the History of Art, established in 1972 in cooperation with the Clark, is an intensive two-year program that combines academic work, curatorial internships, workshops, an international study tour, and a range of instructors to culminate in a degree of the master of arts in the history of art. Located on the Clark Campus, the program draws on and works closely with the art history resources of both institutions. Of the nearly 1,500 graduates of the program, notable alumni include Cara Starke, Director of the Pulitzer Arts Foundation, James Rondeau, Director of the Art Institute of Chicago, and Paul Provost, Deputy Chairman of Christie's.

Educational programs 
The Clark offers extensive public educational programs that range from guided gallery talks to lectures, film series, studio art courses, and interactive activities for children to engage visitors of all ages and backgrounds with the Clark's collections and exhibitions. The interactive nature of the programs reflects the general mission of the Clark to advance the public understanding of art's transformative power.

Clark Prize for Excellence in Arts Writing 
The Clark Prize for Excellence in Arts Writing has been awarded every other year since 2006. The prize "celebrates informed, insightful, and accessible prose that advances the public understanding and appreciation of the visual arts." The award is presented for "critical or historical writing that conveys complex ideas in a manner that is grounded in scholarship yet appealing to a diverse range of audiences."

In 2006, three people were honored. One person was then selected each time it has been given until 2022, where there were two winners due to the pandemic shutdown.  Winners of the Prize are:
 2006: Kobena Mercer, Linda Nochlin and Calvin Tomkins
 2008: Peter Schjeldahl
 2010: Hal Foster
 2012: Brian O'Doherty
 2015: Eileen Myles
 2017: Darcy Grimaldo Grigsby
 2022: Hilton Als and Helen Molesworth

Library 
Established in 1962, the Clark library is one of the major art reference and research libraries in the United States. The library has over 280,000 volumes and many special collections, including Robert Sterling Clark's rare books collection. Materials include standard art reference titles and databases, monographs and scholarly journals in 65 languages from more than 140 countries, exhibition catalogs and museum publications, auction catalogs (including many nineteenth- and early twentieth-century catalogs), and artists’ books. The library is open to the general public and admission is free.

Directors
 Peter Guille (1955–1966)
 George Heard Hamilton (1966–1977)
 David Brooke (1977–1994)
 Michael Conforti (1994–2016)
 Olivier Meslay (2016–present)

Collection
Initially, the Clarks concentrated on Italian, Dutch, and Flemish Old Master paintings. Over time, their tastes shifted towards artists like John Singer Sargent, Edgar Degas, Winslow Homer, and Pierre-Auguste Renoir. After 1920, the Clarks focused mainly on the art of 19th-century France — specifically works of Impressionism and the Barbizon School. Over the next 35 years, the Clarks would add to their private collection, increasing their holdings of paintings, porcelain, silver, prints, and drawings from the early fourteenth to the early twentieth century.

Since its establishment in 1955, the Clark Art Institute has continued to grow its collection through acquisitions, gifts, and bequests, with a recent focus on expanding its photography collection. In 2007, the Manton Foundation donated the collection of its founders, Sir Edwin and Lady Manton, to the museum. The Manton Collection of British Art includes more than 200 works by British artists like J.M.W. Turner, Thomas Gainsborough, and John Constable. In 2013, Frank and Katherine Martucci gave the museum eight George Inness landscapes, supplementing his two works already in the collection. 

The Clark has continued to build and shape its collection to realize more fully and effectively its mission. Recent acquisitions include Brutus Condemning His Sons to Death by Guillaume Lethière as well as the Landscape Album (PAYSAGE) which contains approximately one hundred landscape drawings mostly by Lethière himself.  Additional new acquisitions include The Swearing in of President Boyer at the Palace of Haiti by Adolphe-Eugène-Gabriel Roehn, the Tea Service of Famous Women (Cabaret des femmes célèbres) painted by Marie-Victoire Jaquotot, and a recent important gift from Frank and Katherine Martucci of early photographs of and by Black Americans, particularly by Edward J. Souby and James Van Der Zee.

Today, the museum is best known for its works of French Impressionism, specifically the paintings of Renoir, academic paintings by Jean-Léon Gérôme and William-Adolphe Bouguereau, and its collection of European and American silver.

Special Exhibitions 
The Clark presents special exhibitions throughout the year on a wide range of topics. More information about current exhibitions can be found directly on the website.

Collection highlights

Old Master paintings

19th-century paintings

Impressionism and Post-Impressionism

Pierre-Auguste Renoir

Academic paintings

American paintings

Manton Collection of British Art

Featured Prints and Drawings

Photography

References

External links

"Richard Kendall: Picasso Looks at Degas" – video

Art museums and galleries in Massachusetts
Museums in Berkshire County, Massachusetts
Williamstown, Massachusetts
FRAME Museums
Research institutes in Massachusetts
Art museums established in 1955
1955 establishments in Massachusetts
Pietro Belluschi buildings
Tadao Ando buildings
Modernist architecture in Massachusetts